The Maja is a right tributary of the river Crasna in Romania. It discharges into the Crasna in Supur.

References

Rivers of Romania
Rivers of Sălaj County
Rivers of Satu Mare County